South Bengkulu is a regency of Bengkulu Province, Indonesia, on the island of Sumatra. It covers 1,186.10 km2, and had a population of 142,940 at the 2010 Census and 166,249 ay the 2020 Census.

Administrative districts 

The Regency is divided into eleven districts, tabulated below with their areas and their populations at the 2010 Census and the 2020 Census. The table also includes the number of administrative villages (rural desa and urban kelurahan) in each district.

References

External links
 Official site

Regencies of Bengkulu